Tucabia is a small picturesque country village in New South Wales, Australia in the Clarence Valley district. It lies on the alternate Pacific Highway route for visitors heading into the coastal towns of Minnie Water and Wooli.

Facilities in the village include a general store where you can buy fuel, a school and pre-school.

References

Towns in New South Wales
Northern Rivers
Clarence Valley Council